Ali Baba (c. 854) was a ruler of the Nubian kingdom of Makuria. He was forced to sue for peace to end the war between Makuria and Egypt that had started in 854.1

References
E.A Wallis Budge, A History of Ethiopia: Nubia and Abyssinia, 1928 (Oosterhout, the Netherlands: Anthropological Publications, 1970), p. 104.

Nubian people
Kingdom of Makuria
9th-century monarchs in Africa